The  is a major botanical garden near the University of Tsukuba at 4-1-1 Amakubo, Tsukuba, Ibaraki Prefecture, Japan. It is open daily except Mondays; an admission fee is charged.

As a research branch of the National Museum of Nature and Science, the garden is one of Japan's foremost botanical research facilities and provides public education. It currently contains about 5000 taxa of domestic and exotic plants from temperate and tropical regions around the world, with a particular emphasis on vascular plants of central Japan, East Asian ferns, Cycadaceae, Colocasia, and South American orchids.

The garden's outdoor collections are arranged into the following sections: Evergreen Broad-leaved Forest, Temperate Coniferous Forest, Warm-temperate Deciduous Broad-leaved Forest, Cool-temperate Deciduous Broad-leaved Forest, Shrubs, Sandy and Gravelly, Montane Grassland (High Altitudes), Montane Grassland (Low Altitudes), Rookeries (Coastral), Rookeries (High Altitudes), Marsh Plants, and Hygrophytes and Aquatic Plants.

The garden contains three greenhouses:

 Tropical Resource Plants House (about 550 m², 17.5m high) — useful plants from the tropics. 
 Tropical Rain Forest House (about 24 meters high) — two rooms for Lowland and Montane climates, emphasizing plants of Asian-Pacific regions. The Montane room conserves species such as fagaceous, ericaceous, and orchidaceous plants with high diversities in South-east Asia.
 Savanna House — tropical and subtropical plants from semi-arid savanna areas, with zones for the Americas, Africa, and Australia.

As of 2007 the garden supported eight researchers in plant taxonomy, with ongoing studies in cytotaxonomy to determine the number and shape of chromosomes, molecular biology based on DNA sequencing, chemotaxonomy using secondary metabolites, and plant morphology based on branching systems and pedology.

See also 
 List of botanical gardens in Japan

References

External links

 Tsukuba Botanical Garden
 National Science Museum
 BGCI entry
 - Journal produced by the Tsukuba Botanical Garden

Botanical gardens in Japan
Tsukuba, Ibaraki
Gardens in Ibaraki Prefecture
Greenhouses in Japan